European Legions is a compilation album by the Norwegian black metal band Mayhem. Tracks 1 to 7 are live tracks, and tracks 8 to 12 are pre-production tracks from the Grand Declaration of War sessions.

Track listing

Credits
Maniac (Sven Erik Kristiansen) - vocals
Blasphemer (Rune Eriksen) - guitar
Necrobutcher (Jørn Stubberud) - bass guitar
Hellhammer (Jan Axel Blomberg) - drums

References

Mayhem (band) albums
2001 compilation albums
Season of Mist albums